Gishi (also Romanized as Gīshī and Geyshī) is a village in Emamzadeh Abdol Aziz Rural District, Jolgeh District, Isfahan County, Isfahan Province, Iran. At the 2006 census, its population was 780, in 206 families.

References 

Populated places in Isfahan County